Babuji, a variant of Babu, is an Indian honorific. It may refer to:

 Sudhir Phadke (1919–2002), Indian singer-composer
 Jagjivan Ram (1908–1986), former Deputy Prime Minister of India
 Ram Chandra (Babuji) (1899–1983), Indian spiritual leader
 Ramsevak Singh (Babuji) (born 1953), Indian politician
 "Babuji", a song from the 2007 film Salaam-e-Ishq

See also
 Babaji, Afghanistan